Bund Deutscher Holzwirte (BDH) (English: Association of German Wood Scientists) is a professional and alumni association for graduates of the German degree course for Holzwirtschaft (English: Wood Science), founded in 1950.

History
The BDH was founded on 22 July 1950 in Hamburg (Germany) by graduates of the degree program for Holzwirtschaft. 
This course of study was established in 1939 by the Reichsinstitut für ausländische und koloniale Forstwirtschaft (English: Reich Institute for Foreign and Colonial Forestry).  As of 1946 the University of Hamburg continues the course.

Purpose
The purpose of the BDH is 'to promote wood economy by exchanging professional experiences as well as maintaining personal contacts of the members, to support the professional development of the members and to inform about the degree program for Holzwirtschaft' (translated paragraph of the statutes).

References

Timber industry
1950 establishments in Germany
Organizations established in 1950
Professional associations based in Germany
Non-profit organisations based in Hamburg